Marija Bulatović (born 16 May 1995) is a Montenegrin cross-country skier. She competed in the 2018 Winter Olympics.

References

1995 births
Living people
Cross-country skiers at the 2018 Winter Olympics
Montenegrin female cross-country skiers
Olympic cross-country skiers of Montenegro